Steven Albert Martin (born  May 31, 1974) is a former American football defensive tackle that played for seven teams in a nine-year National Football League career. He played college football at the University of Missouri.

He was drafted by the Indianapolis Colts in 1996.  After playing 30 games he was released by the Colts in 1998 and finished out the season in Philadelphia.  After the 1999 season he went to Kansas City and the New York Jets.  He played for the New England Patriots in 2002 but his constant media interviews angered coach Bill Belichick while his advertised strengths at stopping the run went unrealized.  Following a 24-7 loss to a Tennessee Titans squad that rushed for 238 yards, Martin was interviewed by New York papers before a game against his former Jets team and his comments about the reduction in his role incensed Belichick, who cut him days before the game.<reference>

Martin played for Houston in 2003 and Minnesota in 2004 before his career ended.  He finished with 127 games, 200 tackles, eight sacks, and two forced fumbles.

References

External links
 NFL.com player page
 Football Database

1974 births
Living people
Sportspeople from Jefferson City, Missouri
Players of American football from Saint Paul, Minnesota
American football defensive tackles
Jefferson City High School alumni
Missouri Tigers football players
Indianapolis Colts players
Philadelphia Eagles players
Kansas City Chiefs players
New York Jets players
New England Patriots players
Houston Texans players
Minnesota Vikings players